USA-304, also known as GPS-III SV03 or Matthew Henson, is a United States navigation satellite which forms part of the Global Positioning System. It was the third GPS Block III satellite to be launched.

Satellite 
SV03 is the third GPS Block III satellite to be launched. Ordered in 2008, launch was pushed back several times to 2020 due to delays with the first and second satellites.

Launch 
USA-304 was launched by SpaceX on 30 June 2020 at 20:10 UTC atop Falcon 9 booster B1060. The launch took place from SLC-40 of the Cape Canaveral Air Force Station, and placed USA-304 directly into semi-synchronous orbit. About eight minutes after launch, Falcon 9 B1060 successfully landed on Just Read the Instructions.

Orbit 

References 

GPS satellites
USA satellites
SpaceX military payloads
Spacecraft launched in 2020